OASys is the abbreviated term for the Offender Assessment System, used in England and Wales by Her Majesty's Prison Service and the National Probation Service to measure the risks and needs of criminal offenders under their supervision. Initially developed in 2001, it was built upon the existing ‘What Works’ evidence base.

OASys is designed to enable a properly trained and qualified individual; often a Probation Officer, to:
 assess how likely an offender is to be re-convicted
 identify and classify offending-related needs, including basic personality characteristics and cognitive behavioural problems
 assess risk of serious harm, risks to the individual and other risks
 assist with management of risk of harm
 links the assessment to the supervision or sentence plan
 indicate the need for further specialist assessments
 measure change during the period of supervision / sentence.

OASys comprises a series of computer-based forms on which clinical evaluations are made by staff of Offenders, and supervision and sentence plans for the forthcoming period of supervision are recorded on a periodic basis - typically every 16 weeks for offenders in the community, and less frequently for imprisoned offenders.

OASys supports the What Works? initiative of the Prison and Probation Services, by providing metrics by which the characteristics of offenders and their offences (inputs) can be analysed alongside information on interventions made (inputs) to the offender, and re-conviction data for offenders (outcomes), in order to enable refinement to be made to interventions (based on a consideration of the relation between inputs and outcomes)  as to improve outcomes - in other words, to decrease recidivism rates by ensuring that interventions are as appropriate and purposeful as possible.

References

External links
OASys: the new Offender Assessment System - National Probation Service, Spring 2003
Findings from the measurement of OASys completion rates - Ministry of Justice, March 2009

Penal system in England
Penal system in Wales
2002 establishments in England
2002 establishments in Wales